Michael Gazella (October 13, 1895 – September 11, 1978) was an American major league baseball player who played for the New York Yankees on several championship teams in the 1920s.

Born in Olyphant, Pennsylvania, Gazella played football as well as baseball at Lafayette College and Mansfield University of Pennsylvania. In 1923, he was signed by New York and played in eight games for the Yankees that season. Consigned to the minor leagues in 1924 and 1925, he played for teams in Minneapolis and Atlanta before rejoining New York in the 1926 season as a utility infielder, usually playing third base.

The Yankees played in the World Series every year Gazella was on the team, winning three. However, Gazella played in only the 1926 Series, in which the Yankees lost to the St. Louis Cardinals.

After retiring, Gazella managed the Ponca City Angels of the Western Association and the Moline Plowboys of the Three-I League, as well as scouted for the Yankees.

Gazella died in an automobile accident in Odessa, Texas on September 11, 1978.

References

External links

Interview with Michael Gazella conducted by Eugene Murdock on June 6, 1978, in Odessa, Texas.

1895 births
1978 deaths
Atlanta Crackers players
People from Olyphant, Pennsylvania
Baseball players from Pennsylvania
Hollywood Stars players
Lafayette Leopards baseball players
Lafayette Leopards football players
Los Angeles Angels (minor league) players
Major League Baseball infielders
Mansfield Mounties baseball players
Minneapolis Millers (baseball) players
Moline Plowboys players
New York Yankees players
New York Yankees scouts
Players of American football from Pennsylvania
Ponca City Angels players
Road incident deaths in Texas